IBCS may refer to:

  Integrated Air and Missile Defense [IAMD] Battle Command System (IBCS)
 Input-Buffered Crossbar Switch
 The Institute For Black Catholic Studies at Xavier University of Louisiana
 Integrated Battlefield Control System
 Intel Binary Compatibility Standard (iBCS), an application binary interface for Intel microprocessors
 International Business Communication Standards